God Is My Broker is a satirical book written by Christopher Buckley and John Tierney, published in 1998 by Random House which parodies self-help books, such as those of Deepak Chopra, whose works are particularly singled out.

The protagonist is Brother Ty, a failed stockbroker, who becomes a monk at a failing wine-producing monastery. The book tells his tale of financial and spiritual improvement while setting out the 7½ Laws of Spiritual and Financial Growth.

In an interview with The New York Times, Christopher Buckley said that the initial idea was to do a straightforward hoax, but that the publishers were reluctant, due to their 'Anonymous' author having just been 'un-anonymoused'.

References 

1998 books
Satirical self-help books
Parody books